Andrew Pringle Jr. (born March 19, 1927) is a retired major general in the United States Air Force who served as Chief of Staff of Strategic Air Command from 1980 to 1982.

References

1927 births
Possibly living people
United States Air Force generals